The 1904 United States presidential election in Nevada took place on November 8, 1904, as part of the 1904 United States presidential election. Voters chose three representatives, or electors to the Electoral College, who voted for president and vice president.

Nevada was won by the Republican ticket of incumbent President Theodore Roosevelt (NY) and Senator Charles W. Fairbanks (IN) by a margin of 23.79%, roughly mirroring the results of the national popular vote. After the state had voted overwhelmingly for James B. Weaver and William Jennings Bryan during the three previous elections, Roosevelt claimed the state for the Republican Party for the only time between 1888 and 1920.

Roosevelt won every county in the state, becoming the first Republican presidential candidate to do so; this has since only been repeated by Richard Nixon in 1972, Ronald Reagan in 1984, and George H.W. Bush in 1988.

Following this election, Nevada would eventually become a bellwether that has reflected the result in 26 of the 29 presidential elections since (the exceptions were in 1908, 1976 and 2016).

Results by county

See also
United States presidential elections in Nevada

References

1904 Nevada elections
Nevada
1904